The number of Canadians who are of English descent is largely unknowable given the propensity of many Canadians to use the term "English Canadians" or "English-Canadians" to mean anglophone Canadians .

Notable English immigrants to Canada
 Roger Abbott, comedian – born in Birkenhead
 Steve Armitage, sports announcer – born in Buckinghamshire
 Michael Bonacini, celebrity chef, restaurant owner, born in Wales
 Patrick Brown, broadcast journalist
 Mackenzie Bowell, 5th Prime Minister of Canada
 Kim Cattrall, actress
 Garry Chalk, actor and voice actor
 Michael Cowpland, entrepreneur and businessman
 Alfred Gardyne de Chastelain, father of Canadian general John de Chastelain
 Richie Hawtin, Electronic musician and disc jockey
 David Hewlett, actor famous for his role as Dr. Rodney McKay in Stargate SG-1, Stargate Atlantis and Stargate Universe and who was born in Redhill, Surrey, England but later raised in Canada at the age of four after emigrating there with his family.
 Dick Howard, soccer commentator – raised in Birkenhead
 Lennox Lewis, former professional boxer
 Peter Mansbridge, broadcast journalist and television news anchor
 Julian Richings, character actor
 Dave Ridgway, former CFL placekicker
 Ron Searle, 4th mayor of Mississauga
 Nina Tangri, politician
 Amanda Tapping, actress
 Claire Trevena, politician
 John Turner, 17th Prime Minister of Canada
 Chris Wiggins, actor
 Maurice Dean Wint, actor
 Robin Wood, film critic and educator
 Frank Yallop, former soccer player and current team manager – raised in Watford and Vancouver
 Alan Young, actor, comedian, radio host and television host

Notable Canadians of English descent
 Martin Short, stand-up comedian
 Bryan Adams, popular music star performer
 Margaret Atwood, fiction writer
 Oswald Avery, medical researcher – born in Halifax, Nova Scotia to English immigrant family.
 Earl W. Bascom, artist, sculptor, inventor, actor, Hall of Fame inductee, "Father of Modern Rodeo", grandson of English immigrant
 R. B. Bennett, 11th Prime Minister of Canada – of New England Planter descent; Bennett family had migrated to Connecticut in the 17th century.
 Billy Bishop, flying ace
 Robert Borden, 8th Prime Minister of Canada – of New England Planter descent; paternal ancestor Richard Borden settled in Portsmouth, Rhode Island in 1638.
 John Carling, son of English migrant to Upper Canada and brewery founder Thomas Carling, politician and along with his brother ran brewery.
 Hayden Christensen, actor – portrayed the teen-aged and adult Anakin Skywalker in the Star Wars prequel trilogy
 Adam "Edge" Copeland, actor and retired professional wrestler
 Catherine Disher, actress and comedian
 Paul Dobson, voice actor
 David Edgar, soccer player – father is former pro Eddie Edgar
 Owen Hargreaves, soccer player – English mother and Welsh father
 Stephen Harper, 22nd Prime Minister of Canada
 Joseph Howe, prominent Nova Scotia leader and father of Confederation – son of a United Empire Loyalist, the Howe family were descendant of Puritan migrants.
 Michael Ironside, Canadian actor of English, Scottish and Irish descent
 Carly Rae Jepsen, singer-songwriter and actress
 Sonija Kwok, Hong Kong actress, born there to English and Chinese parentage
 Jack Layton, New Democratic Party leader – Laytons immigrated to Canada
 Shawn Mendes, singer-songwriter – English mother
 Mike Myers, actor and comedian – parents immigrated to Canada from the Liverpool area
 Steve Nash, star basketball player – born to British expatriates in South Africa, raised along with soccer player brother Martin in Victoria, British Columbia.
 Christopher Plummer, Academy Award-winning actor
 Keanu Reeves, film actor
 Glenn Stetson, singer and member of vocal group The Diamonds – family origins are in Devon
 Trish Stratus, Canadian wrestler with English descent
 John Abbott, 3rd Prime Minister of Canada
 Cobie Smulders Canadian actress with English descent

 
English

English